No. 326 (GC/II/7 'Nice') Squadron RAF was a Free French fighter squadron given a Royal Air Force squadron number during World War II.

History
The squadron was formed in Calvi, Corsica on 1 December 1943 from GC/II/7 'Nice' squadron and was equipped with British Spitfire aircraft. 

The squadron followed the Allied advance through Europe from Southern France supporting the Free French Army and by April 1945 was operating from Grossachsenheim, Germany. It was under RAF control until November 1945 when it disbanded upon reversion to French control.

Aircraft operated

References

External links
 History of No.'s 310–347 Squadrons at RAF Web

326 Squadron
Military units and formations established in 1943
Military units and formations disestablished in 1945